Elizabeth Lenjo is a Kenyan lawyer, who is a lecturer in media law, ethics and business law at the Strathmore University and is a Founding Partner of the Kikao Law Firm, a legal group specializing in entertainment and intellectual property law.

Background and education
Elizabeth was born in Kenya, circa 1986. After attending local primary and secondary schools, she was admitted to the Catholic University of Eastern Africa, graduating in 2009, with a Bachelor of Laws degree. After attending the Advocates Training Program at the Kenya School of Law, she was admitted to the Kenyan bar.

In 2016, she was one of the 40 applicants admitted to the Master of Laws degree course at the University of Turin, in Italy, specializing in intellectual property law. The course is administered by the University of Turin Department of Law in conjunction with World Intellectual Property Organization (WIPO). She graduated in 2017.

She holds certificates in intellectual property law, mediation, arbitration and related subjects from WIPO and Harvard University. She also has a certificate in fashion law, obtained from Fordham University School of Law, in New York City.

Career
Lenjo is a lawyer, advocate of the High Court of Kenya and an expert in the areas of intellectual property law, media law, and entertainment law. She is a practitioner of arbitration and alternative dispute resolution.

After practicing solo for nearly six years, Elizabeth co-founded Kikao Law Firm with legal partner, Sarah Ochwada, who specializes in sports and entertainment law.

Elizabeth Lenjo lectures at Strathmore University, teaching media law and ethics at the university's school of law and teaching business law at the university's school of mathematics.

Family
As of October 2018, Elizabeth Lenjo was a married mother.

Other considerations
In September 2018, Business Daily Africa, a Kenyan, English language, daily newspaper, named Elizabeth Lenjo, among the "Top 40 Under 40 Women in Kenya in 2018".

See also
 Emma Miloyo
 Cynthia Wandia
 Catherine Kariuki Mulika

References

External links
Website of Kikao Law Firm

Living people
1986 births
Kenyan women lawyers
21st-century Kenyan lawyers
People from Nairobi
Kenyan Christians
Kenya School of Law alumni
Catholic University of Eastern Africa alumni
University of Turin alumni
Academic staff of Strathmore University